Tommaso Baldanzi (born 23 March 2003) is an Italian professional footballer who plays as an attacking midfielder for Serie A club Empoli.

Club career 
Born in Poggibonsi and raised in Castelfiorentino, Baldanzi first started playing football at the local grassroots club, aged six; two years later, he joined the youth sector of Empoli, where he came through the youth ranks and won an under-16 national championship in 2019.

On 28 October 2020, the midfielder made his professional debut for Empoli, coming on as a substitute in a Coppa Italia 4-2 win against Benevento: in the occasion, he assisted Leonardo Mancuso's closing goal. In the same season, he helped Empoli's Under-19 team win the Campionato Primavera, being also nominated as the league's MVP in the process.

In the following season, after featuring in the UEFA Youth League, Baldanzi was officially promoted to the first team, together with team-mates Jacopo Fazzini and Duccio Degli Innocenti. He then made his Serie A debut on 22 May 2022, replacing Patrick Cutrone at the 74th minute of the 0-1 away win against Atalanta.

On 28 August of the same year, he started his first league match against Lecce, which ended in a 1-1 draw. Three days after, on 31 August, he scored his first professional goal in the 1-1 league draw against Hellas Verona. On 23 January 2023, Baldanzi scored the only goal of a 0-1 league victory against Inter Milan.

International career 
Baldanzi has represented Italy at various youth international levels, having played for the under-17, under-18 and under-19 national teams.

In June 2022, he was included in the squad that took part in the 2022 UEFA European Under-19 Championship in Slovakia, where the Azzurrini reached the semi-finals before losing to eventual winners England.

Both in May and December 2022, Baldanzi was involved in training camps led by the Italian senior national team's manager, Roberto Mancini, and aimed to the most promising national talents.

Style of play 
Baldanzi is an attacking midfielder, who mainly operates as a number 10, but can also play as a left winger in an attacking trio. Due to his low center of gravity, he has shown notable quickness, ball control, technique and creativity. Primarily a left-footer, he can also use his weaker right foot as well, and represents a frequent attacking threat, thanks to his vision, his dribbling skills and his shooting (both from short and long range).

Rated as one of the best Italian prospects of his generation, he has been compared to Sebastian Giovinco and Alejandro Gómez, although he cited Paulo Dybala as his biggest source of inspiration.

Career statistics

Club

Honours 
Empoli U16
 Campionato Nazionale Under-16 A e B: 2019

Empoli U19
 Campionato Primavera 1: 2021

Individual
 Campionato Primavera 1 Most Valuable Player: 2021

References

External links

2003 births
Living people
People from Poggibonsi
Sportspeople from the Province of Siena
Italian footballers
Footballers from Tuscany
Association football midfielders
Italy youth international footballers
Serie A players
Empoli F.C. players